This was the first edition of the tournament.

Tomislav Brkić and Nikola Ćaćić won the title after defeating Andrey Golubev and Andrea Vavassori 3–6, 7–5, [10–3] in the final.

Seeds

Draw

References

External links
 Main draw

Internazionali di Tennis Città di Forlì - Doubles
Internazionali di Tennis Città di Forlì